Yugo Kobayashi (born October 20, 1991) is a Japanese footballer plays as a striker.

Career

Thespakutatsu
Yugo started his club career in 2011 with J2 League club Thespakusatsu. He played for Thespakusatsu three season before moving to Philippines.

Manila All–Japan (JP Voltes)
In 2014 Yugo signed for UFL Division–2 club Manila All–Japan (from 2015 onwards known as JP Voltes). Yugo scored 9 goals for Manila All–Japan in 2014 UFL FA League Cup and was joint second highest goal scorer of the tournament. Six of the nine goals came in a match against Dolphins United. Yugo scored 6 goals for Voltes in 2015 UFL Cup including 4 goal in a match against UST Growling Tigers to take his team to the knock–outs.

Songkhla United
In 2015 Yugo signed for Thai Division 1 League club Songkhla United. He had a good first season with the club scored 8 goals.

Aizawl
In August 2017, Yugo was signed by Aizawl F.C. for 2017–18 I-League season. He made his debut for Aizawl in the match against Mohun Bagan.

Career statistics

References

External links
 
 

1991 births
Aizawl FC players
JPV Marikina F.C. players
Expatriate footballers in Thailand
Expatriate footballers in the Philippines
Yugo Kobayashi
Living people
Japanese expatriate footballers
Association football forwards
I-League players
Expatriate footballers in India
Expatriate footballers in Sri Lanka
Japanese expatriate sportspeople in the Philippines
Japanese expatriate sportspeople in India
Japanese footballers